In mathematics, and more specifically in homological algebra, the splitting lemma states that in any abelian category, the following statements are equivalent for a short exact sequence 
 

If any of these statements holds, the sequence is called a split exact sequence, and the sequence is said to split.

In the above short exact sequence, where the sequence splits, it allows one to refine the first isomorphism theorem, which states that:
to:
 
where the first isomorphism theorem is then just the projection onto .

It is a categorical generalization of the rank–nullity theorem (in the form  in linear algebra.

Proof for the category of abelian groups

and  
First, to show that 3. implies both 1. and 2., we assume 3. and take as  the natural projection of the direct sum onto , and take as  the natural injection of  into the direct sum.

To prove that 1. implies 3., first note that any member of B is in the set.

By exactness . The subsequence  implies that  is onto; therefore for any  in  there exists some  such that . Therefore, for any c in C, exists k in ker t such that c = r(k), and r(ker t) = C.

To show that 2. implies 3., we follow a similar argument.

An alternative "abstract nonsense" proof of the splitting lemma may be formulated entirely in category theoretic terms.

Non-abelian groups
In the form stated here, the splitting lemma does not hold in the full category of groups, which is not an abelian category.

Partially true
It is partially true: if a short exact sequence of groups is left split or a direct sum (1. or 3.), then all of the conditions hold. For a direct sum this is clear, as one can inject from or project to the summands. For a left split sequence, the map  gives an isomorphism, so  is a direct sum (3.), and thus inverting the isomorphism and composing with the natural injection  gives an injection  splitting  (2.).

However, if a short exact sequence of groups is right split (2.), then it need not be left split or a direct sum (neither 1. nor 3. follows): the problem is that the image of the right splitting need not be normal. What is true in this case is that  is a semidirect product, though not in general a direct product.

Counterexample
To form a counterexample, take the smallest non-abelian group , the symmetric group on three letters.  Let  denote the alternating subgroup, and let }.  Let  and  denote the inclusion map and the sign map respectively, so that

 

is a short exact sequence.  3. fails, because  is not abelian, but 2. holds: we may define  by mapping the generator to any two-cycle. But every permutation is a product of two-cycles, so  is the trivial map, whence  is the trivial map, not the identity.

References
 Saunders Mac Lane: Homology. Reprint of the 1975 edition, Springer Classics in Mathematics, p. 16
 Allen Hatcher: Algebraic Topology. 2002, Cambridge University Press, p. 147

Homological algebra
Lemmas in category theory
Articles containing proofs